Goldthorpe railway station serves the village of Goldthorpe, in South Yorkshire, England. It was opened in May 1988.

Although it passed through the three settlements of Goldthorpe, neighbouring Thurnscoe and Bolton upon Dearne, the Swinton & Knottingley Joint Railway only provided one station for the area, at Bolton; both the other settlements were served by stations on other lines.  Until 1961 this station was called Bolton on Dearne for Goldthorpe and was served by Sheffield-York stopping services.

By the late 1980s the low demand for York-bound passengers meant that only a handful of stopping trains used the line. South Yorkshire Passenger Transport Executive, responding to increasing demand for Sheffield-Leeds passengers in the area, and a lack of capacity on the Sheffield-Barnsley-Leeds line, sponsored an hourly service via Bolton to  & , and opened new stations at Goldthorpe and Thurnscoe.

Facilities
The layout here is very similar to neighbouring  (and other stations opened on the same route, e.g.  and ), namely two wooden platforms with basic shelters on each side.  The station is unmanned and has a ticket machine, so tickets can be purchased at the station or on the train.  Digital display screens and timetable posters provide train running information.  Step-free access is available to both platforms via ramps from the nearby road.

Service

A similar frequency operates on Sundays, though starting later in the morning.

References

External links

Railway stations in Barnsley
Railway stations opened by British Rail
Railway stations in Great Britain opened in 1988
Northern franchise railway stations